Extinction is a 2018 American science fiction action film directed by Ben Young and written by Spenser Cohen and Brad Kane. The film is about a father who has a recurring dream/vision about the loss of his family while witnessing an evil force bent on destruction. The film stars Michael Peña, Lizzy Caplan, Mike Colter, Lilly Aspell, Emma Booth, Israel Broussard, and Lex Shrapnel. It was released on Netflix on July 27, 2018.

The film had originally been scheduled for a theatrical release on January 26, 2018, by Universal Pictures, but was pulled from the release schedule. Later in February 2018, it was reported that Netflix had acquired the film from Universal. It received negative reviews, with criticism for its confused and weak storyline, character development and pacing.

Plot 
Peter, an engineer, has recurring nightmares in which he and everyone he knows suffer through violent, alien invasion-like confrontations with an unknown enemy. This causes him to have a strained relationship with his wife, Alice, and his daughters Hanna and Lucy. He reluctantly visits a clinic to receive psychiatric help, only to find a patient there who reveals that he is having the same visions, and that the psyche would only suppress these visions. This prompts Peter to believe his visions are of an upcoming invasion.

That night, invading spaceships open fire on the city, causing significant damage. Peter and Alice barricade their apartment amid the sounds of slaughter from ground troops. An armored alien soldier breaks through the barricade and finds Lucy hiding under a table. The soldier pauses to examine the girl, which allows Peter and Alice to immobilize the soldier. Peter, now armed with the soldier's weapon, leads his family out of the building.

Based on his visions, Peter and his family agree to seek shelter at the factory where Peter works. He is able to bypass the rifle's biometric authentication and kill the soldiers guarding the apartment building's exit. They make their way to a tunnel entrance to safely travel to the factory, but not before Alice is injured from a bomb blast. As they regroup, the soldier from their apartment appears, having tracked them with a homing signal on the rifle Peter took. To Peter's shock, the soldier removes his helmet and appears human. Peter forces the soldier to carry Alice to the factory. There, his boss David explains that the invasion has been expected for many years. A medic examines Alice but informs Peter that he cannot save her. As David's men drag the invading soldier off to execute him, he yells to Peter that he can save Alice. Peter agrees to stay with the soldier to save Alice. David will evacuate their children to a subway station where a transport train awaits to take them all to an offsite base.

The soldier surprises Peter by revealing that Alice is a synthetic (AI). To save Alice, she needs an alternate source of power: Peter himself. At the soldier's guidance, Peter cuts open his own chest with a pocket knife, confirming that he is also a synthetic. The soldier connects a cable between the two synthetics and Peter passes out, experiencing in detail what he had thought were visions of the future, but are actually memories of a past war; fearing that android workers ("synthetics") might rise up against humans, the military attacked unarmed synthetics. The synthetics fought back and eventually drove all humans off the planet. Peter and Alice met during the tension, and while fighting the humans, they found Hanna and Lucy, who are also synthetics. To deal with the guilt of what they have done and prevent themselves from living in fear of a reprisal from humans, most synthetics (including Peter and his family) wiped their memories and lived as humans, unaware of their nature or history.

Peter wakes up and the soldier, Miles, explains that humans have been living on Mars for 50 years. He had expected the synths to be monsters, not families with children, and after getting a good look at Lucy under the table, decided that he could not kill anyone. Peter and Alice part amicably with Miles to find their daughters as the humans breach the roof of the factory. As they all depart on the train, David explains that he and a handful of other synthetics kept their memories to stay prepared for the inevitable return of the humans. Peter suggests that some day there could be peace between humans and synthetics.

Cast
 Michael Peña as Peter, Alice's husband and Father of Hanna and Lucy.
 Lizzy Caplan as Alice, Peter's wife and Mother of Hanna and Lucy.
 Mike Colter as David, Peter's boss
 Amelia Crouch as Hanna, Alice and Peter's daughter 
 Erica Tremblay as Lucy, Alice and Peter's daughter 
 Israel Broussard as Miles, a soldier
 Lex Shrapnel as Ray, Samantha's husband
 Emma Booth as Samantha, Ray's wife 
 Lilly Aspell as Megan, Ray and Samantha's daughter
 Nikola Kent as Luke, Peter’s coworker

Production 

In December 2013, it was revealed that the screenplay for Extinction, written by Spenser Cohen, had been included in the 2013 Black List of the year's best unproduced scripts in Hollywood, as voted on by more than 250 studio execs. In January 2014, Joe Johnston signed on to direct the film, and in September 2016, it was revealed that James McAvoy was "in talks" to star.

In October 2016, Ben Young signed on to direct the film, with Johnston having left the project a while back. In January 2017, it was announced that Michael Peña would star in the role McAvoy had been courted for. In February 2017, Universal Pictures won worldwide distribution rights to the film, with principal production set to begin in April 2017. In March 2017, Lizzy Caplan and Israel Broussard joined the cast, while Mike Colter and Lex Shrapnel joined in April, and Emma Booth in May.

Release 
Extinction was released on July 27, 2018, on Netflix. The film had originally been scheduled for a theatrical release on January 26, 2018, by Universal Pictures, but was pulled from the release schedule. Later in February 2018, it was reported that Netflix had acquired the film from Universal.

Reception 
The website's critical consensus reads, "Extinction has a few intriguing ideas, but they -- and some game performances from its talented stars -- are lost in the movie's muddled plot and frustrating pacing." On Metacritic, the film has a weighted average score of 40 out of 100, based on 6 critics, indicating "generally unfavorable reviews".

Jake Nevins of The Guardian gave it 2/5 stars and called the film "a competent, if formulaic film", writing that, by virtue of not being viewed theatrically, the film's flaws are magnified and its strengths were weakened. In his 1.5/4 star review for RogerEbert.com, Nick Allen wrote "There's a tightness that I respect with Extinction. It's not so much a thrill-ride but a movie monorail, with one revelation at the end meant to reconsider the entire journey. That speaks to its efficiency as the latest in mindless, if not attention-less Netflix movies. Extinction doesn't seek to be much, but it's just not all that charming, either."

References

External links
  on Netflix
 
 

2018 films
American science fiction thriller films
American disaster films
Alien invasions in films
Films about extraterrestrial life
Films scored by the Newton Brothers
Films with screenplays by Spenser Cohen
Mandeville Films films
English-language Netflix original films
2010s science fiction thriller films
2010s disaster films
Films about artificial intelligence
Films produced by David Hoberman
Films produced by Todd Lieberman
2010s English-language films
2010s American films